Abdullah al-Lafi is a politician from Libya who serving as Vice-Chairman or Vice- President and Deputy Head of Presidential Council of Libya and Representative of Presidential Council of Libya.

References 

Libyan politicians
Living people
Members of the Presidential Council (Libya)
1968 births